Hichem Benmeghit (born April 17, 1988 in Oran) is an Algerian footballer. He currently plays for OM Arzew in the Algerian Ligue Professionnelle 2.

Club career
On January 11, 2011, Benmeghit signed a two and a half year contract with USM Alger.

References

External links
 DZFoot Profile
 

1988 births
Living people
Algerian footballers
Footballers from Oran
Algerian Ligue Professionnelle 1 players
Algerian Ligue 2 players
USM Alger players
USM Blida players
WA Tlemcen players
ES Mostaganem players
RC Relizane players
Association football forwards
21st-century Algerian people